A winged unicorn (cerapter, flying unicorn, pegacorn, or unisus) is a fictional ungulate, typically portrayed as a horse, with wings like Pegasus and the horn of a unicorn. In some literature and media, it has been referred to as an alicorn, a Latin word for the horn of a unicorn, especially in alchemical texts, or as a pegacorn, a portmanteau of pegasus and unicorn.

Description

Winged unicorns have been depicted in art. Ancient Achaemenid Assyrian seals depict winged unicorns and winged bulls as representing evil, but winged unicorns can also represent light.

Irish poet W. B. Yeats wrote of imagining a winged beast that he associated with ecstatic destruction. The beast took the form of a winged unicorn in his 1907 play The Unicorn from the Stars and later that of the rough beast slouching towards Bethlehem in his poem "The Second Coming".

Other representations in media

In Sailor Moon SuperS, a man named Helios, the Guardian Priest the (high priest and guardian) of Elysion who guard the Golden Crystal, took the form of a pegasus, which is depicted as an alicorn, having both a golden horn and wings, as he hid from the Dead Moon Circus after having been imprisoned by Queen Nehelenia. He is voiced by Taiki Matsuno in Sailor Moon, while Yoshitsugu Matsuoka voices him in Sailor Moon Eternal. In the Cloverway English adaptation, he is voiced by Rowan Tichenor and in the Viz Media English adaptation, he is voiced by Chris Niosi. In the English dub of Sailor Moon Eternal, he is voiced by Brian Beacock. In the musicals, Pegasus is voiced by Yuta Enomoto. 
In My Little Pony: Friendship Is Magic, alicorns have made several appearances, including Princess Celestia and her younger sister Luna who formerly ruled Canterlot, then Princess Cadance, the ruler of the Crystal Empire and her daughter Flurry Heart, and her sister-in-law Twilight Sparkle, who formerly lived in Ponyville and now lives in Canterlot as the current ruler of Equestria.
In Sofia the First, the Mystic Isles episodes, one of isles have called the Isle of Unicorns where the winged unicorns were, and in episode 29 of the 4th season "Forever Royal, Part 2", Sofia use the amulet of Avalor to change her into an winged unicorn.
In My Little Pony: Make Your Mark, alicorns return from Friendship Is Magic. Sunny Starscout was originally an earth pony until the end of My Little Pony: A New Generation where she gained translucent wings and a horn. Additionally, the evil pony Opaline is an alicorn with tangible wings and horn.

See also
 List of fictional horses

References

 
Heraldic beasts
Greek legendary creatures
Medieval European legendary creatures
Arthurian legend
Horses in mythology
Fictional horses
Mythological hybrids